Tilques is a commune in the Pas-de-Calais department, Hauts-de-France region in northern France. The placename derives from medieval Flemish: Tilleke.

Geography
Tilques is located 4 miles (6 km) north of Saint-Omer, at the D214 and D943 road junction.

Population

The population of the commune is older than the departmental average: as of 2019, the rate of people aged over 60 years (26.5%) is higher than the departmental rate (25.0%), and the rate of people aged under 30 years (32.7%) is lower than the departmental rate (36.6%).

Places of interest
 The thirteenth-century château d'Ecou at Tilques, which was rebuilt in the 15th century
The church of the Sacred Heart. Its nave was rebuilt in the nineteenth century by Charles Leroy, the architect of the Basilica of Notre Dame de la Treille in Lille.

The castle dates from the thirteenth century, it was remodeled in the fifteenth century. In 1595 it belonged to Adrian Cross Lord of Wasquehal. The mid-eighteenth century, it belonged to Andre de Martigny, then Guislain of Herbais and Family Taffin Tilques who kept two centuries.

See also
Communes of the Pas-de-Calais department

References

Communes of Pas-de-Calais